Peter Davidson (born 29 August 1963) is a former Australian rules footballer who played with the West Coast Eagles and Brisbane Bears in the Victorian/Australian Football League (VFL/AFL).

Davidson was signed up by West Coast for their inaugural season in 1987 after strong performances in the West Australian Football League (WAFL) for Claremont, with whom he won a 'Fairest and Best' award in 1985. He had also represented Western Australia in an interstate match against Victoria at Subiaco in 1986. At West Coast, Davidson suffered from soft tissue injuries and managed just two appearances, prompting him to retire from the VFL at the end of the season.

However Davidson returned in 1990 with Brisbane and in his first game kicked two goals against Geelong. A wingman, Davidson didn't play again until late in the season but put together five successive games to finish the year and performed well against Sydney with 28 disposals and five tackles.

He left Brisbane after just one season but continued playing football in the WAFL with East Fremantle and was a member of their 1992 premiership team.

References

1963 births
West Coast Eagles players
Brisbane Bears players
Claremont Football Club players
East Fremantle Football Club players
Living people
Australian rules footballers from Western Australia
People from Collie, Western Australia
Western Australian State of Origin players